Soccer (football) competitions at the 1999 Pan American Games in Winnipeg, Canada were held between July 23 and August 7, 1999. The event was called as soccer as the event was held in Canada.

Matches were held at the Winnipeg Soccer Complex and Red River Community College.

The women's competition was held for the first time.

Medal summary

Medal table

Medalists

References

 
Soccer
Football
International association football competitions hosted by Canada
1999 in Canadian soccer